The Vereshchyovka train disaster occurred on January 24, 1944, near the village of Vereshchyovka in what was then the Oryol Oblast of the Soviet Union (today the Dyatkovsky District of Bryansk Oblast, Russia). Sources estimate that over 600 people died in the wreck. It is the deadliest train disaster in Russian history.

Accident
The disaster occurred at around 4:00 in the morning as the Vyazma–Bryansk passenger train approached a temporary wooden bridge spanning a recently-formed lake. The Soviet Union was in the midst of World War II, and the train was transporting soldiers to the front line as well as civilian refugees returning to newly liberated lands in the west. Previously, the tracks had run along a solid embankment, under which a stream flowed through a reinforced concrete pipe. However, partisans had recently bombed the embankment, blocking the outlet and leading to the creation of a small lake.

Earlier on the night of the disaster a freight train laden with heavy tanks had crossed the bridge, weakening its supports. As the passenger train crossed the bridge the supports gave way, causing the train to derail. Although many passengers were able to escape onto the ice, it soon broke underneath them, plunging them into the icy water. Death toll estimates range from 600 to over 700 people, although the event was then shrouded in the fog of war and later cloaked in Soviet secrecy, rendering these numbers uncertain. A monument to the disaster was constructed in the 1990s.

References

Railway accidents in 1944
Railway accidents and incidents in the Soviet Union
Derailments in Russia
January 1944 events
1944 in Russia
1944 in the Soviet Union
Rail transport in Bryansk Oblast
1944 disasters in the Soviet Union